The Journal of Corporation Law (JCL), at the University of Iowa College of Law, is the nation's oldest student-published periodical specializing in corporate law. It published its first issue in 1975. Its current adviser is Robert T. Miller, who joined the College of Law faculty in August 2012. The journal is routinely cited by scholars, practitioners, and courts, including the United States Supreme Court.

Membership
Students apply for membership after completing their first year of legal study. The application consists of several short assignments meant to test an applicant's writing and editing ability. Each summer, the editorial board reviews these applications and invites 25 to 30 applicants to become student writers for the following academic year.

As student writers, JCL members write a Note discussing a relevant topic in corporate law. Excellent Notes are selected for publication. In addition, student writers are expected to complete thirty-five secondary hours per semester. This includes time spent at authority checks or on other journal-related projects that the editorial board assigns. Student writers improve their writing and editing skills and contribute to maintaining JCL'''s status as a high quality publication.

Each spring, members of the outgoing editorial board select the next year's board members from the pool of student writers.

 Rankings JCL is widely regarded as one of the premier journals in its field. In a recent ranking of corporate law journals by the ExpressO Law Review Submission Guide, JCL was the highest ranked journal in the field on the basis of total manuscripts submitted through Express0. According to the Washington and Lee Law Journal Rankings, JCL'' is the second-highest ranked corporate law journal in the country.

References

American law journals
Publications established in 1974
University of Iowa College of Law
1974 establishments in Iowa